Francis James Donovan (26 February 1919 – 17 April 2003) was a Welsh footballer who represented Great Britain at the 1948 Summer Olympics. Donovan played amateur football with Milford United, Haverfordwest and Pembroke Borough, where he captained them to promotion in 1947–48 and was selected for the 1948 Great Britain Olympic squad.

He joined the English Football League for Swansea Town, signing for the club in July 1950.

He rejoined Pembroke Borough in July 1951 helping them win the Welsh Football League double in the 1953–54 season.

He subsequently managed Pembroke Borough and Milford United.

He combined his football career with a job as an electrician at Pembroke Docks, and he also owned a sports shop.

References

1919 births
2003 deaths
Welsh footballers
Footballers at the 1948 Summer Olympics
Olympic footballers of Great Britain
Swansea City A.F.C. players
English Football League players
Association football wingers
Pembroke Borough A.F.C. players
Welsh football managers
Milford United F.C. players
Haverfordwest County A.F.C. players